Urra Moor is the highest moor in the North York Moors, North Yorkshire, England. The name is a mix of Old English and Old Norse (horh and haugr) which means The Dirty Hill. The name of Urra Moor applies to the moor as a whole; the summit itself is known as Round Hill.

This track forms part of the route of both the Lyke Wake Walk and the Cleveland Way, and also forms the most commonly used route of ascent for Urra Moor.

Urra Moor is noted for its prehistoric remains. There are a number of barrows, and several carved rocks, including some cup and ring carvings.

References

Marilyns of England
Mountains and hills of North Yorkshire
North York Moors
Moorlands of England